Charitimides (died 455 BCE) was an Athenian admiral of the 5th century BCE. At the time of the Wars of the Delian League, a continuing conflict between the Athenian-led Delian League of Greek city-states and the Achaemenid Empire, he was sent in 460 BCE to Egypt in command of a fleet of triremes (some authors say 40 ships, others 200 ships) to support Inaros II, a Libyan ruler who was leading a revolt against the Achaemenid rule over the country.

Biography
His fleet had been operating on the coasts of Cyprus, from where he was diverted to Egypt.

Charitimides led his fleet against the Achaemenids in the Nile river, and defeated a fleet of 50 Phoenician ships. It was the last great naval encounter between the Greeks and the Achaemenids. Of the 50 Phoenician ships, he managed to destroy 30, and capture the remaining 20 that faced him in that battle.

When the Achaemenids returned with a large army under Megabyzus, they lifted the siege of Memphis where the remaining Persian garrison had been blockaded, and then besieged the Egyptians and their Greek allies in the Siege of Prosopitis in 455 BCE. Charitimides perished in the battle against the Persians at Prosopitis.

Other famous Greek generals who fought for the Egyptians are Chabrias and Agesilaus.

See also
 Wars of the Delian League

References

450s BC deaths
5th-century BC Athenians
Ancient Athenian admirals
Wars of the Delian League
Ancient Greeks killed in battle